Chieseiceras is an extinct genus of ammonites in the family of Ceratitidae. Species are known from the Triassic of Hungary, Italy and Switzerland.

References

 Chieseiceras at the Paleobiology Database

Ceratitida genera
Ceratitidae